Czermna may refer to:
 Czermna, Lesser Poland Voivodeship, a town in south-eastern Poland
  a district of Kudowa-Zdrój in south-western Poland, famed for its Skull Chapel

See also 
 Čermná (disambiguation)
 Czermno (disambiguation)